Department of Narcotics Control is the main government agency responsible for narcotics control in Bangladesh.

History
The Department of Narcotics Control was established on 2 January 1990 under the Ministry of Home Affairs and is related to National Narcotics Control Board. The agency is responsible for issuing licenses for the import, exports, sales, transport, etc. for drugs in Bangladesh. It also carries out raids against illegal narcotics. The department has its own intelligence branch.

Abdul Wahab Bhuiyan is the Director-General of the Department of Narcotics Control. They do not have sufficient personnel to control over Bangladesh. They are trying to increase their staff and better service.

References

1990 establishments in Bangladesh
Organisations based in Dhaka
Drug control law enforcement agencies
Government departments of Bangladesh
Drug policy of Bangladesh